Pittsburgh-Butler Regional Airport , also known as the Butler County Airport or K. W. Scholter Field, is a public airport  southwest of the central business district of Butler, the county seat of Butler County, Pennsylvania, United States.  The airport serves the northern suburbs of the Pittsburgh metropolitan area. It is owned by the Butler County Airport Authority.

History 
Pittsburgh-Butler Regional Airport, formerly Butler County Airport, opened as the Pittsburgh-Butler Airport on September 27 and 28, 1929, with much fanfare and aircraft demonstrations. The airport originally had three turf runways, one of which was later paved, and a turf runway closed. The remaining turf runway ran N/S. The airport was opened by Pennsylvania Aviation Industrial Corp. (PAIC) owned by George Hann, the Mellon interests and some others, who hoped to lure Pittsburgh traffic. During the Great Depression, the airport shut down for some years when there was little business. The two large hangars were used to store corn. In the 1930s, John Graham along with Kenny Sholter helped to clean out the hangars and reopened the airport. It was then renamed the Butler-Graham Airport. During its early years, the airport served as an important training area for potential pilots. One notable trainee was Amelia Earhart who received her instrument flight certificate there while practicing for her solo flight over the Atlantic Ocean in 1932. It was also at the airport that Earhart had the long-range fuel tanks installed on her Lockheed Vega. Another notable aviator was C.G. Taylor, who in 1935 moved his Taylorcraft Aircraft company to Butler. His new planes were tested at the airport and his Taylorcraft B model was introduced here. During World War II Graham Aviation trained so many pilots under the Civilian Pilot Training Program that Piper Cubs had to be stored tilted up on their noses to fit them all in the hangars. For many years, Butler-Graham served as an alternate airport for TWA should the weather be down at Allegheny County Airport, which from 1931-1952 was the primary airport of the city of Pittsburgh until Pittsburgh International Airport opened. The extension of the single runway was completed in 2004.

The airport went through a name change in May 2016, going from the Butler County Airport to the Pittsburgh-Butler Regional Airport.

On October 31, 2020 President Donald Trump held a rally at the airport during his second run as President in the 2020 United States presidential election.

Facilities and aircraft 
For the 12-month period ending February 27, 2007, the airport had 62,685 aircraft operations, an average of 171 per day: 98% general aviation, 2% air taxi and <1% military. There are 132 aircraft based at this airport: 72% single-engine, 23% multi-engine, 3% jet and 2% helicopter.

High Flight Academy, a flight training school with recreational and career pilot programs, is located at this airport.

References

Sources 
An Historical Gazetteer of Butler County, Pennsylvania, Chicora: Mechling Bookbindery, 2006, .
Brandberg, Robert, and James Clements, Lost Butler, New Wilmington: New Horizons Publishing, 1999, .
Ed Biller, "Airport turns 80," Butler Eagle, December 6, 2009.
Parisi, Larry D., Butler County, Arcadia Publishing, 2004, .

External links 
Butler County Airport Website

Airports in Pennsylvania
County airports in Pennsylvania
Transportation buildings and structures in Butler County, Pennsylvania
Butler, Pennsylvania